Igor Kakidzyanov is a former Defense Minister of the self-proclaimed Donetsk People's Republic (DNR). He was Commander-in-Chief of Popular Army, until captured by pro-Ukrainian paramilitaries on 7 May 2014.

After the exchange of prisoners, he returned to the DNR and was active in military and politics. 

In 2018 there was a bomb attack on him and his party, where 3 people were injured, including Kakidzyanov.

References

Living people
Pro-Russian people of the 2014 pro-Russian unrest in Ukraine
People of the Donetsk People's Republic
Pro-Russian people of the war in Donbas
1980 births
People of Anti-Maidan
Ukrainian collaborators with Russia
Anti-Ukrainian sentiment in Ukraine